The  is a commuter railway line in Saitama Prefecture, Japan, operated by the private railway operator Seibu Railway. The  line extends from Nishi-Tokorozawa Station on the Seibu Ikebukuro Line to Seibukyūjō-mae Station in Tokorozawa, Saitama.

Stations and service pattern
All stations are located in Tokorozawa, Saitama. Abbreviations here are for the table below, not formally used.

  Stops at all stations.

  (SE)

  (Ex)

History
The line and its two stations opened on 1 May 1929, initially electrified at 1,200 V DC. This was raised to 1,500 V DC in 1952.

Station numbering was introduced on all Seibu Railway lines during fiscal 2012, with Seibu Sayama Line stations numbered prefixed with the letters "SI" (part of the Seibu Ikebukuro group of lines).

References
This article incorporates material from the corresponding article in the Japanese Wikipedia

 
Rail transport in Saitama Prefecture
Sayama Line
Sayama Line
1067 mm gauge railways in Japan
Railway lines opened in 1929
1500 V DC railway electrification